Ctenucha hilliana is a moth of the family Erebidae. It is found on the Antilles, including Cuba.

References

hilliana
Moths described in 1915